Grabnik  is a village in the administrative district of Gmina Jaktorów, within Grodzisk Mazowiecki County, Masovian Voivodeship, in east-central Poland.

The village has a population of 3.

References

Grabnik